Strobilurus is a genus of fungi in the family Physalacriaceae. The genus has a widespread distribution in temperate regions, and contains 10 species. Species of Strobilurus grow on pine cones.

Species

References

Physalacriaceae
Taxa named by Rolf Singer